NGC 538 is a barred spiral galaxy in the constellation of Cetus. It is located about 250 million light-years from the Milky Way with a diameter of approximately 95,000 ly. NGC 538 was discovered by the American astronomer Lewis Swift in 1886.

NGC 538 is estimated to be about 2.5 billion years old.

See also 
 List of NGC objects (1–1000)

References

External links 
 

Barred spiral galaxies
Cetus (constellation)
0538
005275
00991
+00-04-130